This page lists the world fisheries' production. The tonnage from capture and aquaculture is listed by country.

Fish, crustaceans, molluscs, etc.
Following is a sortable table of the world fisheries' harvest for 2018. The tonnage from capture and aquaculture is listed by country. Capture includes fish, crustaceans, molluscs, etc.

Aquatic plants
Following is a sortable table of the world fisheries' harvest of aquatic plants for 2005. The tonnage from capture and aquaculture is listed by country. Countries whose total harvest was less than 100,000 tons are not included.

See also
 List of harvested aquatic animals by weight
 Ocean fisheries
 Outline of fishing
 Population dynamics of fisheries
 Wild fisheries
 World fish production

References

 FAO: Fisheries and Aquaculture 2005 statistics
 FAO: FIGIS: Time-series query on Capture: Quantity

External links
Fish capture by country since 1950

 
Lists of countries by production